Kshetrimayum Bhabananda Singh is a politician belonging to the Bharatiya Janata Party from Manipur. On 25 May 2017, he won a bypoll to the Rajya Sabha by securing 39 votes against Congress candidate Dwijamani who secured 21 votes. He secured votes of BJP, NPP, NPF, LJP and TMC MLA (who has joined the BJP) and few Congress MLAs who have crossed over to the BJP.

References

1950 births
Living people
Rajya Sabha members from Manipur
Bharatiya Janata Party politicians from Manipur